Carolyn Roberts  is a British water resource management specialist, and the Frank Jackson Professor of the Environment at Gresham College, London. She is a senior scientist at the University of Oxford's Knowledge Transfer Network (KTN), which links business and universities in promoting environmental technology research and innovation.

Roberts is a Fellow of the Institution of Environmental Sciences, a Chartered Environmentalist and a Chartered Scientist, a Fellow of the Chartered Institute of Water and Environmental Management, and a Fellow of the Royal Geographical Society.

References

Living people
British environmentalists
British women environmentalists
Professors of Gresham College
Fellows of the Royal Geographical Society
Year of birth missing (living people)